Events from the year 1880 in Scotland.

Incumbents

Law officers 
 Lord Advocate – William Watson until May; then John McLaren
 Solicitor General for Scotland – John Macdonald; then John Blair Balfour

Judiciary 
 Lord President of the Court of Session and Lord Justice General – Lord Glencorse
 Lord Justice Clerk – Lord Moncreiff

Events 
 February – telephones introduced in Edinburgh.
 27 April – 1880 United Kingdom general election: The Liberal Party defeat the Conservatives by a substantial majority following the 'Midlothian campaign' by William Ewart Gladstone who is returned as Member of Parliament for Midlothian and becomes Prime Minister of the United Kingdom.
 1 July – the Callander and Oban Railway is opened throughout to Oban.
 A. & R. Scott of Glasgow begin producing the predecessor of Scott's Porage Oats.

Births 
 29 March – Bobby Templeton, footballer (died 1919)
 4 April – William Russell Flint, watercolourist (died 1969)
 30 April – Charles Exeter Devereux Crombie, cartoonist (died 1967)
 6 May – Edmund Ironside, British Army officer (died 1959)
 14 May – B. C. Forbes, financial journalist (died 1954 in the United States)
 1 July – Noel Skelton, Unionist politician, journalist and intellectual (died 1935)
 13 August – Mary Macarthur, trade unionist (died 1921)
 September – Peter Kyle, footballer (died 1961)
 23 September – John Boyd Orr, physician and biologist, recipient of the Nobel Peace Prize (died 1971)
 15 October – Marie Stopes, author, palaeobotanist, campaigner for women's rights and pioneer in the field of birth control (died 1958)
 18 October – Alexander Livingstone, Liberal politician (died 1950)
 Margaret McCoubrey, suffragette and pacifist in Belfast (died 1955 in Northern Ireland)
 Dorothy Carleton Smyth, artist and designer (died 1933)
 Preston Watson, aviator (killed in military aviation accident 1915)

Deaths 
 3 April – John Laing, bibliographer and Free Church minister (born 1809)
 31 December – John Stenhouse, chemist (born 1809)

Sport 
Scottish Grand National first run under this name.
1870s Rangers F.C. seasons
1879–80 Heart of Midlothian F.C. season
1879–80 Hibernian F.C. season
1879–80 Scottish Cup
1880 Open Championship
1880–81 Scottish Cup
1880–81 Heart of Midlothian F.C. season
1880–81 Hibernian F.C. season

Establishments 
Dykehead F.C.
East Craigie F.C.
Forth Corinthian Yacht Club
Parkhead F.C.
Port Glasgow Athletic F.C.
Selkirk F.C.
Strachur and District Shinty Club

The arts
 William McGonagall produces his doggerel poem "The Tay Bridge Disaster" to commemorate the previous December's Tay Bridge disaster.

See also 
 Timeline of Scottish history
 1880 in the United Kingdom

References 

 
Years of the 19th century in Scotland
Scotland
1880s in Scotland